Dr. William B. Pritchard House is a historic home located at Princess Anne, Somerset County, Maryland. It is a -story, five-bay, frame dwelling constructed in several stages between about 1860 and 1906. It features a porch with a distinctive octagonal gazebo.  A traditional 19th-century farmhouse, it was reworked extensively around 1904–1906 in the Colonial Revival style by New York physician, Dr. William B. Pritchard as a country retreat.

It was listed on the National Register of Historic Places in 1996.

References

External links
, including photo from 1994, at Maryland Historical Trust

Houses in Somerset County, Maryland
Houses on the National Register of Historic Places in Maryland
Houses completed in 1906
Colonial Revival architecture in Maryland
National Register of Historic Places in Somerset County, Maryland
1906 establishments in Maryland